Louis-Luc Loiseau de Persuis (4 July 1769 – 20 December 1819) was a French violinist, conductor, choirmaster, teacher, composer, and theatre director.

After commencing his studies of music in his hometown of Metz, Persuis moved to Paris in 1787, and entered the orchestra of the Opéra in 1793. His entire career was within this institution; he became choirmaster in 1803, then conductor in 1810, replacing Jean-Baptiste Rey. He simultaneously worked in administrative rôles, as manager, musical inspector-general (1816), stage manager (1817), then chief director from 3 September 1817 until 13 November 1819, on which date illness forced him to resign.

Persuis composed ballets, operas, and opéras comiques. His greatest success was Le triomphe de Trajan (1807), written in collaboration with Le Sueur. From 1810 to 1815, Persuis was the most performed composer at the Opéra, with 157 performances, largely due to Trajan. His opéras comiques found favour at the Théâtre Favart. He also adapted others' works, for example the oratorio Les Croisés (Die Befreyung von Jerusalem, 1813) by Maximilian Stadler.

Persuis taught singing at the Conservatoire de Paris until 1802. His name was proposed for a singing school at the Opéra, but the school was not established, although he continued to teach choristers informally.

He died in Paris.

Works for the stage

References 
Notes

Sources
 Chaillou, David (2004). Napoléon et l'Opéra, .
 Fauquet, Joël-Marie (2003). Dictionnaire de la musique en France au XIXe siècle, p. 958.
 Gourret , Jean (1984). Ces hommes qui ont fait l’Opéra, pp. 111–112.
 Mongrédien, Jean; Quetin, Laurine (2001). "Persuis, Louis-Luc Loiseau de" in Sadie 2001.
 Sadie, Stanley, editor; John Tyrell; executive editor (2001). The New Grove Dictionary of Music and Musicians, 2nd edition. London: Macmillan.  (hardcover).  (eBook).
 Schreyvogel, Joseph; Glossy, Karl, editor (1903). Josef Schreyvogels Tagebücher, 1810-1823, vol. 2 (in German). Berlin: Gesellschaft für Theatergeschichte. View at Google Books.

External links 
 Works and performances at CESAR
 Notice d'autorité personne for Persuis at BnF

1769 births
1819 deaths
Musicians from Metz
19th-century French composers
French opera composers
French male composers
French conductors (music)
French male conductors (music)
Academic staff of the Conservatoire de Paris
French theatre directors
18th-century French male classical violinists
Directors of the Paris Opera
Burials at Père Lachaise Cemetery